The Almád Abbey was a Benedictine monastery established at Almád in Zala County in the Kingdom of Hungary in 1121 (today Monostorapáti, Veszprém County). Its founders were Atyusz I and Miska I from the Atyusz kindred, who fulfilled their father's will with the foundation. The monastery was dedicated to Mary the Virgin and the All Saints. The deed of the foundation of the monastery was translated and published by Imre Szentpétery in 1927.

References

Sources

External links
 Hangodi, László: Almád: monostoralapítás és az első két évszázad története (1117-1301), archeologia.hu (Part I)
 Hangodi, László: Fejezetek az almádi Boldogságos Szűz Mária és Mindenszentek bencés apátság történetéből, archeologia.hu (Part II)
 Hangodi, László: Fejezetek az almádi Boldogságos Szűz Mária és Mindenszentek bencés apátság történetéből, archeologia.hu (Part III)

Atyusz (genus)
Benedictine monasteries in Hungary